Hernán Alejandro Pérez (born March 26, 1991) is a Venezuelan professional baseball utility player in the Minnesota Twins organization. He previously played in Major League Baseball (MLB) for the Detroit Tigers, Milwaukee Brewers, Chicago Cubs, and Washington Nationals. He also played for the Hanwha Eagles of the KBO League. Pérez was signed by the Tigers as a non-drafted free agent in 2007, and has seen time at every position on the field except for catcher.

Early life
Pérez, was born in San Francisco de Asís, Aragua, Venezuela on March 26, 1991.

Professional career

Detroit Tigers
After Pérez was signed by the Tigers, he was placed with the VSL Tigers of the Venezuelan Summer League In 2009, Pérez was promoted to the GCL Tigers of the Gulf Coast League. He was soon promoted to the West Michigan Whitecaps of the Midwest League. Later that season, he was promoted to the Class A-Advanced Lakeland Flying Tigers of the Florida State League. At the start of 2010, Pérez found himself back with the West Michigan Whitecaps for which he had spent the 2011 season. He was named a Mid-Season and Post-Season All-Star.

Pérez was called up to the Major Leagues by Detroit on June 9, 2012 after Jhonny Peralta went on paternity leave. Pérez made his debut that day, and got his first hit a day later. He was subsequently sent back to Lakeland so Peralta could rejoin the Tigers.

Pérez started the 2013 season with the Double-A Erie SeaWolves. Pérez was recalled to the Tigers on July 9, 2013, replacing Omar Infante who was placed on the disabled list. Pérez was sent back to Double-A's Erie, on August 2, 2013, to make room for the newly acquired José Iglesias. However, Pérez was recalled to the Tigers just three days later, after teammate Jhonny Peralta received a 50-game suspension due to his ties to the Biogenesis scandal. In 33 plate appearances for the Detroit Tigers during the 2015 season, Pérez was batting only .061 with just two hits, one walk, and no RBIs.

Milwaukee Brewers

On June 2, 2015, Pérez was claimed off waivers by the Milwaukee Brewers and activated the same day. Since joining the Brewers, Pérez has primarily been used as a utility player while appearing in at least 120 games during the 2016–2018 seasons. On June 28, 2019, Pérez was designated for assignment. Pérez was outrighted on July 3. Perez Returned to the Brewers when they optioned Travis Shaw to the minors and bought Hernan's minor league contract.  He played shortstop that evening versus the Texas Rangers.

On October 16, 2019, Pérez was outrighted to the Brewers Triple-A affiliate, the San Antonio Missions. He opted free agency and left the team.

Chicago Cubs
On December 9, 2019, Pérez signed a minor league deal with the Chicago Cubs. On August 18, 2020, the Cubs selected Pérez to the active roster. Pérez was designated for assignment by the Cubs on August 31 after going 1-6 in 3 games for Chicago.

Washington Nationals
On January 21, 2021, Pérez signed a minor league contract with the Washington Nationals organization and was invited to Spring Training. Pérez made the Opening Day roster for the Nationals and had his contract selected on March 27. After getting 1 hit in 21 plate appearances across 10 games, on May 4, Pérez was designated for assignment by the Nationals. Pérez cleared waivers and elected free agency on May 6.

Milwaukee Brewers (second stint)
On May 7, 2021, Pérez signed a minor league contract with the Milwaukee Brewers organization and was assigned to the Triple-A Nashville Sounds. He was granted his release on July 4 so that he could join the Hanwha Eagles. In 23 games with Nashville, Pérez batted .357/.396/.536 with 3 home runs and 18 RBI.

Hanwha Eagles
On July 4, 2021, Pérez signed a $300K contract (with a $100K signing bonus) with the Hanwha Eagles of the KBO League. In 59 games, he slashed .268/.321/.411 with 5 home runs and 33 RBIs. Pérez was not re-signed for the 2022 season and became a free agent.

Toros de Tijuana
On April 9, 2022, Pérez signed with the Toros de Tijuana of the Mexican League. He appeared in 3 games, going 3 for 13 with 3 RBIs. Pérez was released by Tijuana on April 26, 2022, in order to pursue an opportunity with an affiliated organization.

Atlanta Braves
On April 27, 2022, Pérez signed a minor league deal with the Atlanta Braves. Pérez played in 86 games for the Triple-A Gwinnett Stripers, slashing .269/.318/.406 with 9 home runs, 39 RBI, and 20 stolen bases. He elected free agency following the season on November 10, 2022.

Minnesota Twins
On March 15, 2023, Pérez signed a minor league contract with the Minnesota Twins organization.

World Baseball Classic 
Pérez represented Venezuela in the 2017 World Baseball Classic and again in 2023.

See also

 List of Major League Baseball players from Venezuela

References

External links

 

1991 births
2017 World Baseball Classic players
Living people
Águilas del Zulia players
Chicago Cubs players
Detroit Tigers players
Erie SeaWolves players
Gulf Coast Tigers players
Lakeland Flying Tigers players
Leones del Caracas players
Major League Baseball infielders
Major League Baseball outfielders
Major League Baseball players from Venezuela
Milwaukee Brewers players
Nashville Sounds players
People from Aragua
Salt River Rafters players
San Antonio Missions players
Tigres de Aragua players
Toledo Mud Hens players
Toros de Tijuana players
Venezuelan expatriate baseball players in Mexico
Venezuelan expatriate baseball players in the United States
Venezuelan Summer League Tigers players
Washington Nationals players
West Michigan Whitecaps players
World Baseball Classic players of Venezuela
2023 World Baseball Classic players